Higa or Fija (written: 比嘉) is a Ryukyuan surname. Notable people with the surname include:

Daigo Higa (born 1995), Japanese boxer
, Japanese footballer
Kumiko Higa, Japanese voice actress
Maurren Higa Maggi, Brazilian athlete and Olympic gold medalist
Maya Higa, American conservationist, falconer, wildlife rehabilitator, and Twitch streamer. 
Minoru Higa, grandmaster of Shōrin-ryū Kyudōkan
Pēchin Higa, Ryukyuan martial artist
Ricardo Higa, former Brazilian-Japanese footballer
Ryan Higa, American internet personality
Sekō Higa, Gojū Ryū karate teacher
Thomas Taro Higa, American inventor and World War II veteran
Teruo Higa, horticulturist and professor at the University of the Ryukyus
Yuchoku Higa, Japanese karate practitioner
Yukari Higa, Japanese manga artist
Byron Fija, Okinawan language activist

See also
Higa River, a tributary of the Bârnaru River in Romania
Lake Higa, a small lake in eastern Burkina Faso

Okinawan surnames
Japanese-language surnames